
Albert Bürger (13 June 1913 – 16 March 1996) was a fire official in West Germany. During World War II, he served in the Luftwaffe and was a recipient of the Knight's Cross of the Iron Cross.

Awards
 Knight's Cross of the Iron Cross on 17 April 1945 as Oberleutnant of the Reserves in the Stab 4. Flak-Division
 Order of Merit of the Federal Republic of Germany (Verdienstorden der Bundesrepublik Deutschland)
 Merit Cross 1st Class (Bundesverdienstkreuz 1. Klasse) (31 May 1953)
 Grand Merit Cross (Großes Bundesverdienstkreuz) (17 June 1970)
 Grand Merit Cross with Star (Großes Bundesverdienstkreuz mit Stern) (13 June 1978)
 Grand Merit Cross with Star and Sash (Großes Bundesverdienstkreuz mit Stern und Schulterband') (24 July 1981)

References

Citations

Bibliography

 

1913 births
1996 deaths
People from Schwäbisch Gmünd
Luftwaffe personnel of World War II
People from the Kingdom of Württemberg
Recipients of the Knight's Cross of the Iron Cross
Grand Crosses with Star and Sash of the Order of Merit of the Federal Republic of Germany
Recipients of the Order of Merit of Baden-Württemberg
Military personnel from Baden-Württemberg